Tuilagi is a surname notably shared by a set of Samoan rugby-playing brothers. The five oldest have all represented  at international level in a World Cup while the youngest, Manu chose to represent , also reaching a World Cup and playing for the British and Irish Lions in 2013.

Freddie Tuilagi (born 1971) (Samoa 17 caps)
Henry Tuilagi (born 1976) (Samoa 10 caps)
Alesana Tuilagi (born 1981) (Samoa 37 caps)
Anitelea Tuilagi (born 1986) (Samoa 17 caps)
Sanele Vavae Tuilagi (born 1988) (Samoa 9 caps)
Manu Tuilagi (born 1991) (England 29 caps)

They also have a seventh sibling, born Olotuli, who is fa'afafine and goes by the name Julie Tuilagi.